Broken Hill, an electoral district of the Legislative Assembly in the Australian state of New South Wales has had two incarnations, from 1894 to 1913 and from 1968 to 1999.


Election results

Elections in the 1990s

1995

1991

Elections in the 1980s

1988

1984

1981

Elections in the 1970s

1978

1976

1973

1971

Elections in the 1960s

1968

1913 - 1968

Elections in the 1900s

1907

1904

1901

Elections in the 1890s

1898

1895

1894

References 

New South Wales state electoral results by district